Personal property is a type of property.

Personal property may also refer to:

 Personal Property (film), a 1937 romantic comedy film
 "Personal Property" (song), a 1992 rock song by Def Leppard